Mina Khatun (born 20 October 1986) is a Bangladeshi former cricketer who played as a right-handed batter and wicket-keeper. She played for Bangladesh between 2007 and 2009, before the team was granted full international status. She played domestic cricket for Rajshahi Division.

References

External links
 
 

1986 births
Living people
Bangladeshi women cricketers
Rajshahi Division women cricketers